Jaḍgālī is an Indo-Aryan language spoken by the Jadgal, an ethno-linguistic group of Pakistan and Iran. It is one of only two Indo-Aryan languages found on the Iranian plateau. It is a dialect of Sindhi most closely related to Lasi.

The majority of the Jadgali population is found in Pakistan, where a 2004 estimate placed it at 15,600, and in Iran, where according to a 2008 estimate it is at least 25,000. In Iran at least two varieties are spoken, which are reportedly not easily intercomprehensible.

The term Jadgal is of Balochi origin, but it is nowadays used by the Jadgal themselves, alongside their earlier endonym Nummaṛ, which is the source of the language names Nummaṛī and Nummaṛikī.

Jadgali is underdocumented. According to Emeneau, it is likely to have been the source of early Indo-Aryan influences on Balochi and Brahui and therefore studies of the language could help bring insights into the linguistic history of the area.

In Iran 

In Iran, Jadgali is spoken in the Dashtyari region in the south and south-east of Sistan and Balochistan Province, particularly in Pullān, Pīr Suhrāb and Bāhū Kalāt; all neighbouring communities are Balochi-speaking. Most speakers of Jadgali ethnically self-identify as Jadgal, while a small number see themselves as Jadgal-Baloch. In wider contexts, they identify as Baloch, and are fully accepted as such by the Balochi speakers, with whom they are physically and culturally indistinguishable. The Jadgal claim to be of Baloch origin and to have changed their language because of interactions with their neighbours at the time when they were settled in Las Bela, a region at the eastern end of Balochistan. According to this story, they left their homeland after a defeat from the ruler of Sindh and then moved westward, eventually settling in Dashtyari during the reign of Shah Abbas.

Balochi is the language of wider communication, all male adults are bilingual in it, and it is more likely to be the one passed on to children in mixed marriages. However, attitudes to Jadgali are positive and the language is vital. Persian is used relatively often. In addition to Balochi TV programmes, some people also watch Sindhi-language broadcasts from Pakistan.

References

Bibliography 

 (access limited).

Languages of Iran
Languages of Balochistan, Pakistan
Western Indo-Aryan languages